Moss Farm is a residential subdivision neighborhood within the Lake Highlands neighborhood of Dallas, Texas. It includes 696 houses in an area which is bordered by Whitehurst Drive to the north, Abrams Road to the east, Royal Lane to the south and Greenville Avenue to the west.

The neighborhood is zoned to Richardson ISD. The area is served by Moss Haven Elementary School, Forest Meadows Junior High School, Lake Highlands Freshman Center and Lake Highlands High School.

Moss Farm Alliance
The Moss Farm Alliance is the voluntary homeowners' association for the residents of Moss Farm which pays for off-duty Dallas police officers to patrol the neighborhood and hosts events for the benefit of residents.

External links
Moss Farm Alliance